Alfred Schmitt (30 November 1907 – 2 April 1973) was a French astronomer. Schmitt worked at Algiers Observatory in the 1930s and 1940s and at the Royal Observatory in Uccle, Belgium in the 1950s. From 1955 to 1958 he was also director of the Quito Observatory in Ecuador. He extensively studied minor planets and comets and is credited with having discovered four asteroids.

Personal life 

Between 1940 and 1948 he married his colleague, astronomer Odette Bancilhon and thereafter she signed her work as O. Schmitt-Bancilhon.

Signature 

Schmitt's publications are all signed A. Schmitt, following the practice of his profession at that time.

Boyer 

In 1932, Schmitt discovered an asteroid while working at the Algiers Observatory and named it in honor of his colleague, Louis Boyer – asteroid 1215 Boyer.

20 years later, Boyer named 1617 Alschmitt in Schmitt's honor.

References

External links 
 Dictionary of Minor Planet Names, Google books

20th-century French astronomers
Discoverers of asteroids
1907 births
1973 deaths
French people in French Algeria
French expatriates in Belgium